San Gabriel Island is a small island belonging to Uruguay, located on the Río de la Plata near the city of Colonia del Sacramento.

It was named by explorer Sebastian Cabot in 1527.

San Gabriel and nearby Farallón have been declared National Monument.

References

External links

River islands of Uruguay
Islands of the Río de la Plata
Geography of Colonia Department